Giddings is the county seat of Lee County, Texas, United States situated on the intersection of U.S. Highway 77 and U.S. Route 290. Its population was 4,969 at the 2020 census. The city is in Lee county, named in honor of Confederate General Robert E. Lee.

History

The land where the city of Giddings now stands was part of the land granted to Stephen F. Austin in 1821 for a colony in Spanish Texas, and later became part of the Robertson Colony.

The city itself was founded in 1871 when the Houston and Texas Central Railway came to the area. It probably took its name from local magnate Jabez Deming Giddings, who was instrumental in bringing the railway to the area. He had come to the area from Pennsylvania in 1838 to claim the land bounty of his brother Giles A. Giddings, killed at the Battle of San Jacinto. Another theory is that the city was named after Jabez's brother Dewitt Clinton Giddings.

Early settlers in the new town were mostly pioneers from the surrounding communities, such as Old Evergreen and Shady Grove. The majority of these people were ethnically British Isles natives, but a sizable minority were Wendish families from the Serbin area. They would later establish the German-language newspaper Deutsches Volksblatt.

A syndicate headed by William Marsh Rice owned the whole townsite and sold property to settlers. Later, Rice Institute (now Rice University) in Houston had control and sold the lots.

Wide streets were a distinguishing characteristic of the town; the two main thoroughfares (Main and Austin Streets) were 100 feet (30 m) wide, and other streets were 80 feet (24 m) wide. The town's first church, established in 1871, was Methodist. J. D. Giddings Masonic Lodge, chartered in Evergreen in 1865, moved to Giddings, and early churches and a public school met in its building. Soon after the Civil War, freed slaves from farms and plantations settled in Giddings. Classes for more than 50 black students were held in a church in 1883, and the first black public school was built in 1887.

Giddings became the county seat when Lee County was established in 1874. Early businesses included the Granger store, a blacksmith shop and saloon, a millinery shop, a saddle and harness shop, and an oil mill. Brick buildings came in 1875. The courthouse built in 1878 burned and was replaced in 1899. Fletcher House, built in 1879 by August W. Schubert, was sold to the Missouri Synod of the Immanuel Lutheran Church in 1894 to house Concordia Lutheran College. By 1890, the town was part of a rich cotton-growing area with access to the San Antonio and Aransas Pass Railway, several gins, an opera house, newspapers, and a population estimated at 1,000. The First National Bank was opened in 1890 and was still in operation more than a century later. The town was incorporated in 1913 and had a population of 2,000 by 1914.

In the early 1980s, the oil-laden Austin chalk that underlies the town was tapped, and the area experienced an oil boom. Some 300 oil-related businesses located in the town, and many oil rigs were operating in outlying areas. In the late 1980s, however, the oil activities decreased almost to a standstill. The population of Giddings in 1988 was 5,178. In 1990, local businesses included a hospital, a medical clinic, a dialysis clinic, a chiropractic clinic, two nursing homes, a library, motels, restaurants, two newspapers, a peanut mill, Invader Boat Manufacturing Company, and Nutrena-Cargill Mills. Nineteen churches were in the city.

Geography

Giddings is located at  (30.183116, –96.934614).

Climate

The climate in this area is characterized by relatively high temperatures and evenly distributed precipitation throughout the year.  The Köppen climate classification describes the weather as humid subtropical, Cfa.

Demographics

As of the 2020 United States census, 4,969 people, 1,685 households, and 1,364 families were residing in the city.

As of the census of 2000,  5,105 people, 1,639 households, and 1,125 families resided in the city. The population density was 991.9 people per square mile (382.7/km). The 1,852 housing units averaged 359.9 per square mile (138.8/km). The racial makeup of the city was 65.99% White, 13.26% African American, 0.51% Native American, 0.57% Asian, 16.47% from other races, and 3.19% from two or more races. Hispanics or Latinos of any race were 34.73% of the population.

Of the 1,639 households, 38.1% had children under 18 living with them, 52.8% were married couples living together, 11.4% had a female householder with no husband present, and 31.3% were not families. About 27.6% of all households were made up of individuals, and 13.5% had someone living alone who was 65 or older. The average household size was 2.74, and the average family size was 3.39.

In the city, the age distribution was 31.3% under  18, 13.5% from 18 to 24, 24.7% from 25 to 44, 15.7% from 45 to 64, and 14.9% who were 65 or older. The median age was 29 years. For every 100 females, there were 108.4 males. For every 100 females 18 and over, there were 98.7 males.

The median income for a household in the city was $31,046, and for a family was $37,115. Males had a median income of $27,370 versus $21,706 for females. The per capita income for the city was $14,768. About 13.8% of families and 15.3% of the population were below the poverty line, including 20.5% of those under 18 and 12.0% of those 65 or over.

Economy
Compared to other places, Giddings has an unusually high number of mining, quarrying, and oil and gas extraction (6.46 times higher than expected), other services except public administration (2.55 times), and transportation and warehousing (2.24 times) industries. From 2016 to 2017, employment in Giddings grew at a rate of 4.79%, from 2300 to 2410 employees. 

Major employers include:

Altman Plants.  Headquartered in California, the company has a total greenhouse area of 38 acres and 20 docks at the Giddings facility that equip the company to effectively and efficiently turn quality material around from the greenhouse to regional retail garden centers.

Kaemark The nation's largest manufacturer of salon furnishings, the company's headquarters in Giddings features a =10,000 sq ft showroom facility where buyers can view hundreds of different types of salon equipment including Made In The USA styling stations, shampoo bowls, wet stations, reception desks and more.

Giddings State School. Giddings State School is a juvenile correctional facility of the Texas Juvenile Justice Department located in unincorporated Lee County, Texas, near Giddings.

The Giddings Seed Laboratory (previously Pieratt's Seed Lab), a project of the Texas Department of Agriculture, is located in Giddings.

The United States Postal Service operates the Giddings Post Office in Giddings.

Giddings is a part of the Rural Capital Area Workforce Development Board and the area is served by Workforce Solutions in a community partnership that provides no cost recruitment, employment, and information services to businesses and job seekers in the nine-county Rural Capital Area

The business community is served by both the Giddings Economic Development Corporation and the Small Business Development - Texas State, each of who assist existing businesses and aspiring entrepreneurs with free face-to-face business consulting and at-cost business

In 2014, the Giddings Economic Development (GEDC) purchased 165 acres of land on the east side of town with highway frontage for the development of the Giddings 290 Business Park.  The GEDC broke ground on construction in the spring 2015. The GEDC also expanded its office space to a new location along Hwy 290 to increase visibility and to provide more amenities to clients.

Education
The City of Giddings is served by the Giddings Independent School District. Giddings High School is a 9th-12th grade campus located in Giddings, Texas. The campus is a member of District 13-AAAA Div.2 with an enrollment of 657 students.

The Texas Youth Commission operates the Giddings State School in unincorporated Lee County, near Giddings.

The Texas Legislature designates most of Lee County (Giddings included) as being in the Blinn Junior College district.

Media
Local newspapers serving Giddings and Lee County at large are presently the Giddings Times and News and the Lexington Leader.

A local radio station, KGID, Inc. FM 96.3, has operated since 2018.

The Giddings Deutsches Volksblatt, a trilingual German-English-Wendish/Sorbian newspaper, was published in Giddings.

Arts and culture

In 2015, the city of Giddings, the Giddings Economic Development Corporation and members of the American Legion launched Phase I of the Veterans Memorial Wall Project. The Lee County Veterans Association was created to manage and conduct fundraising for the project which broke ground in Spring 2020.

The Wendish heritage in Giddings is celebrated annually in nearby Serbin, Texas, put on by the Texas Wendish Heritage Society. It occurs on the fourth Sunday every September.

The Giddings Area Chamber of Commerce operates the Lee County Heritage Center/ Hubert-Fletcher Home.

The City Meat Market restaurant at the corner of Austin and Main Streets was rated one of the 50 best places for barbecue by Texas Monthly.

In 2017, Texas Monthly Magazine selected Snow's BBQ as Best BBQ in Texas, thereby elevating female pitmaster Tootsie Tomanetz to regional celebrity status one week before her 85th birthday.  The business was previously honored with this award in 2008.  Tomanetz is slated to appear in the Netflix documentary Chef's Table.

The Historic Freight Station and Depot Complex is located in Downtown Giddings. Property owner Giddings Economic Development Corporation has leased one of the freight stations to Dime Box Distillery for use as a tasting room and bottling operation and another building for use as a Brewhaus and German Restaurant, currently under development.

In popular culture 
The 2021 season of the Netflix series Chef's Table takes a look at barbecue around the world and will feature Lee County pitmaster Tootsie Tomanetz.

Notable people

 Gwendolyn Bennett (born in Giddings in 1902), a major Harlem Renaissance figure, poet, short story writer, and art news and criticism column "Ebony Flute," Opportunity magazine
Gus Mutscher, former Speaker of the Texas House of Representatives
David J. Porter (born 1956), Texas Railroad Commissioner; unseated incumbent Victor G. Carrillo in the 2010 Republican primary election; Certified Public Accountant in Giddings
Hilton Smith, pitcher in Negro-league baseball
Tootsie Tomanetz, pitmaster of Snow's BBQ, twice voted by Texas Monthly as Best BBQ in Texas
Larry Wade,  World Class 110 Hurdler and NCAA Champion in 110 Hurdles (Texas A&M University)\

References

External links

 
 Handbook of Texas Online about Giddings
 Tourist Guide to Giddings

Cities in Texas
Cities in Lee County, Texas
County seats in Texas
Sorbian-American culture in Texas
Populated places established in 1871
1871 establishments in Texas